Geiger is an advertising specialties company with more than 500 employees and more than 550 sales representatives. It is the industry's largest family-owned and family-managed distributorship and is based in Lewiston, Maine.

Initially named Geiger Brothers, it was founded in Newark, New Jersey in 1878 and spans 5 generations.

History 
The company was founded when brothers Andrew and Jacob Geiger took over their father’s two-room print shop in Newark, New Jersey. A staff of 4 -- the brothers, a printer, and a bookkeeper—produced a small line that included advertising calendars, fans, and greeting cards. The second generation brothers, Frank, Charles, and George entered the company in the early 20th century. They added date books and diaries to their expanding line.

Frank’s two sons, Ray and Frank, joined the business in the 1930s. Frank led the firm into the distribution of advertising specialty products made by other companies. Ray acquired the renowned Farmers’ Almanac becoming its 6th editor for the next 60 years.

The company moved to Lewiston, Maine in 1955. Their facility has been expanded four times and underwent an extensive renovation in 2017-2018. During the renovation process, they added a large solar array of 696 panels to generate 100% of the power needed by the renovated facility. In 2019, Geiger's Maine headquarters was awarded LEED gold certification by the US Green Building Council (USGBC). 

Two of Ray’s sons manage the company today. Gene is CEO and President and Peter Geiger is Executive Vice President and editor of the Farmers’ Almanac  

On March 6 2013, Geiger agreed to divest its manufactured products division to Canada based Blueline.

Farmers' Almanac 
The Farmers' Almanac is a compendium of knowledge on weather, gardening, cooking, remedies, managing your household, preserving the earth, and more. Published every year since 1818, it was founded by David Young, Philom. In 1949, Ray and Ann Geiger obtain the rights to Almanac Publishing Company/Farmers’ Almanac. Geiger Bros. has produced and distributed the Farmers’ Almanac ever since.

Peter Geiger succeeded Ray Geiger as editor in 1994 and is the current Philom.

Notes 

Companies based in Maine
Marketing companies established in 1878
Family-owned companies of the United States